Hildegund C. J. Ertl is a researcher who works at The Wistar Institute in Philadelphia. Her research is focused on developing vaccines for AIDS and various forms of cancer. Her lab is currently working on projects related to HIV vaccines, human papilloma virus vaccines, rabies vaccine models, universal influenza vaccine, vaccines to Epstein–Barr virus, and using adeno-associated viral vectors to measure immune response to gene therapy. Ertl's research into vaccine has taken a different approach from conventional wisdom, combining parts of different viruses that pose no harm to humans but still stimulate an immune response.

In 2007, Ertl helped create The Wistar Institute Vaccine Center. She has served as its director since its inception. Ertl said that the vaccines the laboratories in the center are developing "have important implications for public health because they can reduce disease and death from very common infections. Additionally, she said that she wants to make existing vaccines more accessible in developing areas such as Africa and Asia.

In interviews, Ertl has been cautious and critical when it comes to the development of vaccines for AIDS. Her research has shown that the vaccine may exhaust key cells of the immune system that are needed to fight the virus.

Select publications
 Ertl, HC., The ideal vaccine:until death do us part., Molecular Therapy. 2011 May;19(5):820-2.
 Ertl, HC, Zaia J, rosenberg SA, June CH, Dotti G, Kahn J, Cooper LJ, Corrigan-Curay J, Strome SE., Considerations for the Clinical application of Chimeric antigen Receptor T cells: Observations from a Recombinant DNA Advisory Committee Symposium held June 15, 2010., Cancer Research. 2011 May 1;71(9):3175-3181.,
 Martino AT, Suzuki M, Markusic DM, Zolotukhin I, Ryals RC, Moghimi B, Ertl, HC, Muruve DA, Lee B, Herzog RW., The genome of self-complementary AAV vectors increases TLR9-dependent innate immune responses in the liver., Blood. 2011 Apr 7. [Epub ahead of print.]
 Haut LH, Ratcliffe S, Pinto AR, Ertl H., Effect of preexisting immunity to adenovirus on transgene product-specific genital T cell responses on vaccination of mice with a homologous vector., Journal of Infectious Diseases. 2011 Apr 15;203(8):1073-81.
 Hutnick NA, Carnathan DG, Dubey SA, Cox KS, Kierstead L, Makadonas G, Ratcliffe SJ, Lasaro MO, Robertson MN, Casimiro DR, Ertl, HC, Betts MR., Vaccination with Ad5 vectors expands Ad5-specific CD8 T Cells without altering memory phenotype or functionality., PLoS One. 2010 Dec 22;5(12):e14385.

External links
Dr. Ertl's page on The Wistar Institute's website

References

Living people
Cancer researchers
Year of birth missing (living people)